Nick Bontis (born May 27, 1969) is a Canadian academic, management consultant, speaker, sports management executive and author. His research focuses on intellectual capital, knowledge management and organizational learning. Bontis is Associate Professor and Chair of Strategic Management at the DeGroote School of Business, McMaster University in Hamilton, Ontario. He is also the director of the Institute for Intellectual Capital Research, a management consulting firm and research think-tank that specializes in conducting human capital diagnostic assessments for corporate and government clients. He is an associate editor of the Journal of Intellectual Capital and chief knowledge officer of Knexa Solutions, a knowledge exchange auction.

In 1992, Bontis graduated with a bachelor's degree from Ivey Business School, University of Western Ontario. In 1999, he graduated with a Doctor of Philosophy (Business Administration) from Ivey.

Academic 
Bontis teaches business strategy to undergraduates, knowledge management to MBAs and advanced statistics to doctoral students. He is also the coordinator of the fourth year commerce capstone course.

Awards 
He has received awards for teaching and research. Maclean's has rated him as one of McMaster's most popular professors for six years in a row. In 2007, Bontis was one of the 38 professors nominated for the 2008 Ontario's Best Lecturer award.  In February 2008, TVO announced that he was among the top ten finalists. In 2008, the OUSA (Ontario Undergraduate Student Alliance) recognized him as the top university professor in the province.  In 2009, Bontis was awarded the 3M National Teaching Fellowship, He was also the OCUFA Teaching Award winner which is given to the top professors in Ontario.

Management consultant 
As a management consultant, Bontis advises organizational leaders on various strategic management issues. He is the Chief Data Scientist of Performitiv, a learning software organization.  He is also on the advisory board of several organizations including a variety of educational-based institutions designing and implementing executive development programs across the country.  He is on the executive board of Harvest Portfolios, an investment company based in Oakville, Ontario.  He is a former member of the board of governors for Hillfield Strathallan College, an independent school located in Hamilton, Ontario.  He is a former member of the board of governors for Canada's 10 Most Admired Corporate Cultures program.  He is Director of the Institute for Intellectual Capital Research, a management consulting firm that specializes in conducting human capital measurement diagnostics. In 2012, Bontis was elected as a member of the Board of Directors for the Canadian Soccer Association.

Speaker 
Bontis presents for a variety of industry, government and association audiences. His presentation topics typically focus on knowledge worker productivity, information bombardment and collaboration drawing from his research expertise surrounding the strategic management and measurement of an organization's intangible assets.

Media 
Bontis has a regular role on a CHCH-DT News segment entitled "Bontis on Business" during which he highlights the past week's business news.

Bontis was a regular guest on the TV Show Always Good News which aired on CTS (Crossroads Television System).  He often spoke about new technology, the economy, and management trends.

Bontis wrote a weekly column in The Hamilton Spectator that appeared on Saturdays entitled "Bontis on Business", typically articles that highlighted local entrepreneurs and new ventures.

Sports management executive 
Bontis was appointed co-chair of the Sport Organizing Committee for Men's and Women's Soccer at the 2015 Pan American Games.

Bontis is serving his third term on the board of directors of the Canadian Soccer Association. As Chair of the Strategic Management Committee, Bontis was responsible for formulating the CSA's Strategic Plan entitled Leading a Soccer Nation.  
In May 2017 Bontis was appointed vice president of Canada Soccer. On May 7, 2018 he was re-elected vice president.

In February 2019, Bontis spearheaded Canada Soccer's launch of an updated version (2019–2021) of the strategic plan entitled Canada Soccer Nation.

On November 21, 2020, Bontis was elected president of Canada Soccer.

On February 27, 2023, Bontis resigned as president of Canada Soccer after Canada's provincial and territorial soccer federations sent Bontis a letter requesting he step down amid labour disputes between the men’s and women’s senior national teams.

Other interests 
Bontis has played soccer competitively since childhood for a variety of  clubs in Ontario (Scarborough Maple Leaf, Scarborough Azzurri, London City, London Portuguese, Dundas United, Hamilton Greek Olympic). In 1991, he assisted Scarborough Azzurri in winning the Ontario Cup by contributing a goal against Sora Lazio.

He  plays for Proto Stars (H&DOSL) and Schalke FC (H&D). He is a former winner of the Ontario Cup (five times) and represented Canada in a World Youth Cup tournament in Bremen, Germany in 1986. As a varsity soccer player at the University of Western Ontario, he was a multiple OUA all-star, leading goal scorer and team MVP. Bontis also received the Bronze W and the Purple Blanket Award as an outstanding dual athlete at UWO. He was a Canadian all-star and national silver medallist in the running long jump as a member of the UWO varsity track & field team.

Bontis was the head coach for the Hamilton Sparta 2003 boys soccer team.  He has several years of coaching experience and is licensed (USSF National B, USSF National C, CSA Provincial B, OSA Pre B, OSA Level 3, OSA Respect in Sport, NCCP Making Ethical Decisions; NCCP Concussion: Making Head Way).

On December 20, 2010, Bontis carried the Olympic Torch in downtown Hamilton while it was en route to the 2010 Winter Olympics in Vancouver.

On June 21, 2015, Bontis carried the Pan American Games Torch in downtown Ancaster while it was en route to the 2015 Pan American Games in Toronto.

On October 19, 2018, Bontis was inducted into the Western Mustangs Sports Hall of Fame for his significant achievements in soccer and track & field.

Bibliography
 Bontis, N. (2011). "Information bombardment: Rising above the digital onslaught." Hamilton: Institute for Intellectual Capital Research. 
 Borins, S., Kernaghan, K., Bontis, N., Brown, D., Thompson, F. and Perri 6. (2007). Digital State at the Leading Edge: Lessons from Canada. Toronto: University of Toronto Press. 
 Bontis, N. (2004). eBusiness Essentials. Greenwich, CT: Information Age Publishing. 
 Bontis, N. (2002). World Congress of Intellectual Capital Readings. Boston: Elsevier Butterworth Heinemann KMCI Press.

References

External links
 Official website

1969 births
Businesspeople from Toronto
Living people
Academic staff of McMaster University
University of Western Ontario alumni
Soccer players from Toronto
Canadian soccer players
Canadian people of Greek descent
Canadian management consultants
Canadian motivational speakers
Business speakers
London City players
Canadian National Soccer League players
Association footballers not categorized by position
Presidents of the Canadian Soccer Association